The volleyball competition in the 2009 Summer Universiade was held at different venues in Serbia between 2–11 July 2009.

Men

Women

External links

 
2009 Summer Universiade
Universiade
Volleyball at the Summer Universiade